Krog Street Market is a  mixed-use development in Atlanta, located along the BeltLine trail at Edgewood Avenue in Inman Park which opened in Summer 2014. The marketplace has been planned to have four or five restaurants and merchants such as florists, cheesemakers, butchers, and bakers under one roof. It is to incorporate two existing parcels on either side of Krog Street: The Stove Works on the west side and the former Tyler Perry Studios at 99 Krog Street, on the east side. The conversion to Krog Street Market is to cost $70 million. The Stove Works is to remain unaltered. Illustrations in the plans show the existing bridge over Krog Street renovated as a pedestrian bridge and incorporated as part of the complex.

Site history
The Atlanta Stove Works, a former pot-belly stove and iron-pan factory opened in 1889, and flourished in the 1920s when it began exporting the 32 BOX stove that sparked industrial demand and expansion. After decades and decline was abandoned around 1988 before being transformed into a mixed-use development of offices, Rathbun's restaurant (opened on site in 2004) and the Krog Bar.

The former studio space at 99 Krog Street was used until 2008 by Tyler Perry Studios, now located in Greenbriar, Southwest Atlanta. Tyler had purchased the land from Atlanta Stage Works in 2006 for a reported $7 million.

References

External links

Official website
Brochure from leasing agent SRS Real Estate
"Stove Works" history on "Return to Atlanta" (blog)

Buildings and structures in Atlanta
Industrial landmarks in Atlanta
Food markets in the United States
Mixed-use developments in Georgia (U.S. state)
Adaptive reuse of industrial structures in Atlanta

Market halls
Food retailers